"Bartier Cardi" is a song recorded by American rapper Cardi B featuring guest vocals from Atlanta-based rapper 21 Savage. It was released on December 22, 2017, as the second single from her debut studio album Invasion of Privacy (2018). The song was written by the two performers and its producers 30 Roc and Cheeze Beatz. Its official music video received a nomination for Best Hip-Hop Video at the 2018 MTV Video Music Awards.

Background
Cardi B teased the release of the single through social media and confirmed it on December 20. Before the release, she became the first female rapper to send her first three Billboard Hot 100 entries to the top 10, with "Bodak Yellow", "No Limit" and "MotorSport". The original version of the song leaked in January 2020 and featured rapper Playboi Carti.

Composition
Cardi B raps a series of triplet rhythms over a minimal trap beat and synth chords, as noted by Rolling Stone. Themes in the lyrics include her attraction for diamonds, sports cars and sex. 21 Savage raps a similar theme from a male perspective. XXL described Cardi's triplet flow as Migos-esque.

Critical reception
Sheldon Pearce of Pitchfork noted "her phrases sway naturally, the same way her chatter does. She never minces words, and in these verses, her taunts and insults are even more cutting." He opined the single is "even more audacious" than her previous "Bodak Yellow" and "full of the same controlled aggression", though "not as instantly quotable". He added "Cardi has a distinct presence, and next to the inexpressive 21 [Savage] she seems even livelier." Jon Caramanica in The New York Times described it as a "sinister, greasy number full of quick-tongued rapping", featuring a "charmingly snarling verse" from 21 Savage. Jose Martinez of Complex described it as a "banger", and Sidney Madden of NPR opined, for its "fairly simple rhyme scheme" it is "perfect" for fans to "belt out in the club". For Tosten Burks of Spin, 21 Savage "feels out of place".

Music video
Directed by Petra Collins, the music video premiered on April 2, 2018. In the video, Cardi B performs on a silver-covered stage in red fur, satin lingerie and diamonds. The visuals are reminiscent of the Hollywood's golden era, as noted by a Vogue editor. The clip features a guest appearance by Offset.

The video features paid promotion from Fashion Nova, which Cardi B is an ambassador for. Throughout the video, many Instagram influencers and models appear including Salem Mitchell, Widney Bazile, Ashourina Washington, Destiny Anderson, and Leanna. Numerous male models are seen standing like the Statue of David in white boxer briefs, among them include twins Austin & Alec Proeh.

Live performances
A snippet of the song was included during her performance with Bruno Mars of the song "Finesse" at the 60th Grammy Awards. Cardi performed "Bartier Cardi" during a medley at the 2018 iHeartRadio Music Awards. On April 7, 2018, Cardi B performed the song in a medley with "Bodak Yellow" on Saturday Night Live.

Awards and nominations

Charts

Weekly charts

Year-end charts

Certifications

Release history

References

External links

2017 singles
2017 songs
Atlantic Records singles
Cardi B songs
21 Savage songs
Songs written by Cardi B
Songs written by 21 Savage
Songs written by 30 Roc